Lowell Corporation is a manufacturing company based in West Boylston, Massachusetts. The company was originally based in Worcester, Massachusetts and called the Lowell Wrench Company.

Lowell Corporation produces ratchet wrenches and other hand tools used for High Line and Pipeline Utility installation and repair.  Lowell also makes ratchets as handles and clutches for inclusion in original industrial and commercial equipment. Through its Porter-Ferguson division, Lowell Corp. also produces portable hydraulic units and repair clamps for the automotive body and frame repair industry.

Notes

References
Lowell Corporation home page

External links
Lowell Corporation

Tool manufacturing companies of the United States
Manufacturing companies based in Massachusetts
Companies based in Worcester County, Massachusetts
Automotive tool manufacturers
Manufacturing companies established in 1869
1869 establishments in Massachusetts